CCGS Cove Isle is a navigation aids tender in the Canadian Coast Guard. Cove Isle is assigned to the Canadian Coast Guard's Central and Arctic Region and is based out of CGS Base Parry Sound, Ontario, on Georgian Bay.

The ship is classified as specialist vessel and used in a variety of roles:

 Resupplies and maintaining lighthouse stations along Georgian Bay
 carries out search and rescue support
 pollution cleanup duties (as required)
 science research support

The ship is not strengthened for navigation in ice-infested waters, so she operates from April to December, or when waterways are ice free. She has a crew of five.

Her length overall (LOA) is 20 meters and her width is 6 meters.

References

External links
 Institute Guide to Combat Fleets of the World: Their Ships, Aircraft, and Systems
 Transport Canada Registration Information

Cove Isle
1980 ships
Ships built in Ontario
Ships of the Canadian Coast Guard